Faustino Adebola Rasheed Anjorin (born 23 November 2001) is an English professional footballer who plays as a midfielder for EFL Championship side Huddersfield Town, on loan from Premier League club Chelsea.

Club career

Early career 
Anjorin joined Chelsea's development centre programme at under-7 level, officially signing with the club at under-9 level. On 30 April 2018, Anjorin scored in the second leg of Chelsea's 2017–18 FA Youth Cup win over Arsenal.

Chelsea 
On 25 September 2019, Anjorin made his debut for Chelsea in a 7–1 EFL Cup win over League Two side Grimsby Town. On 8 March 2020, he made his Premier League debut in a 4–0 home win over Everton after coming on as a 71st minute substitute for Willian. On 8 December 2020, Anjorin made his UEFA Champions League debut and was named in the starting line-up for Chelsea's final group stage match which ended in a 1–1 home draw against Krasnodar. On 10 January 2021, Anjorin made his FA Cup debut as a substitute for Callum Hudson-Odoi in the 80th minute of Chelsea's 4–0 win over League Two side Morecambe.

Loan to Lokomotiv Moscow 
On 2 September 2021, he joined Russian Premier League club Lokomotiv Moscow on a season-long loan, with an option to buy. On 16 September 2021, he scored a late equaliser in the opening game of their Europa League campaign to establish the final score of 1–1 against Marseille. On 30 January 2022, the clubs agreed to terminate the loan early due to Anjorin's injury.

Loans to Huddersfield Town 
Upon returning from his loan at Lokomotiv Moscow, Anjorin joined EFL Championship side Huddersfield Town on 31 January 2022 for the remainder of the 2021–22 season. He made seven league appearances and scored one goal for the Terriers, before his loan was extended for another year on 22 July 2022.

International career
Anjorin is eligible to play for England through his birthplace and for Nigeria through his Nigerian father. Between 2018 and 2019, he represented England at under-17, under-18 and under-19 levels.

On 7 October 2021, Anjorin made his England under-20 debut during a 1–1 draw with Italy at Technique Stadium in Chesterfield.

Career statistics

Honours
Chelsea
 UEFA Champions League: 2020–21
 FA Cup runner-up: 2019–20, 2020–21

References

External links

2001 births
Living people
Sportspeople from Poole
Footballers from Dorset
English footballers
England youth international footballers
Association football midfielders
Chelsea F.C. players
FC Lokomotiv Moscow players
Huddersfield Town A.F.C. players
Premier League players
Russian Premier League players
English Football League players
Black British sportspeople
English people of Nigerian descent
English expatriate footballers
Expatriate footballers in Russia
English expatriate sportspeople in Russia